An X mark (also known as an ex mark or a cross mark or simply an X or ex or a cross) is used to indicate the concept of negation (for example "no, this has not been verified", "no, that is not the correct answer" or "no, I do not agree") as well as an indicator (for example, in election ballot papers or in maps as an x-marks-the-spot). Its opposite is often considered to be the O mark used in Japan and Korea or the check mark used in the West. In Japanese, the X mark (❌) is called "batsu" (ばつ) and can be expressed by someone by crossing their arms.

It is also used as a replacement for a signature for a person who is blind or illiterate and thus cannot write their name.  Typically, the writing of an X used for this purpose must be witnessed to be valid.

As a verb, to X (or ex) off/out or to cross off/out means to add such a mark. It is quite common, especially on printed forms and document, for there to be squares in which to place x marks, or interchangeably checks.

It is also traditionally used on maps to indicate locations, most famously on treasure maps. It is also used as a set of three to mark jugs of moonshine for having completed all distillation steps, while additionally signifying its potency (as high as 150 proof) relative to legal spirits, which rarely exceed 80 proof (40% ABV).

Unicode 

Unicode provides various related symbols, including:

The  mark is generally rendered with a less symmetrical form than the following cross-shaped symbols:

See also
 List of international common standards
 Single-letter second-level domain
 Saltire
 Dagger (typography) † ‡
 Tally marks
 Check mark ✓
 No symbol   ⃠
Mathematics
 Multiplication sign
 Cartesian product
 Cross product
Subcultures
 Straight edge

Footnotes

Cross symbols
Mathematical symbols
Typographical symbols

it:Segno di spunta